Superstar – The Hits is the first greatest hits album by British singer and songwriter Jamelia, released by Parlophone Records on 24 September 2007. The album contains ten out of eleven of Jamelia's UK Top 40 singles to date and omits her debut single, "So High", her first top forty hit "I Do", Drama single "Boy Next Door" and her collaboration with Tiziano Ferro, "Universal Prayer", which remains unreleased in the UK. The album does contain, however, her version of "Stop" for the first time on a Jamelia album.

Jamelia said of the collection "It seems the right time to put out a Greatest Hits and have all the best tracks I've recorded from the past ten years on one album".

Track listing

Chart performance

The album debuted at #55 on September 30 in the UK, becoming Jamelia's lowest charting and selling album to date.

References

Jamelia compilation albums
2007 greatest hits albums